Yitzhak Ben Ner (also transliterated Itzhak Ben-Ner; born July 3, 1937) is an Israeli writer, screenwriter, journalist, and film critic.  He has also hosted and edited radio and TV programs.

Biography
Ben Ner was born in 1937 in Kfar Yehoshua, Israel
 
He attended Tel Aviv University where he studied literature and drama. He started publishing as a boy, and published his first book for adults in 1967. Several books of his have been adapted for theatrical or cinematic productions.

His books and stories have been translated into many languages.

Awards
 In 1981, Be'er was awarded the Bernstein Prize (original Hebrew novel category).
 In 1981, he was awarded the Agnon-Jerusalem Prize 
 In 1983, he received the Ramat Gan Prize for Literature.
 His play Ta'atuon won First Prize at the 1990 Theatroneto Festival.
 In 2005, he was awarded Prime Minister's Prize.

Works

Books
After the Field-Burner (children), 1967
The Man From There (novel), 1967
Rustic Sunset (story collection), 1976
Kishona, Children of the River (children), 1977
After the Rain (3 stories), 1979
My Friend Emmanuel and I (children), 1979
A Far Land (novel in stories), 1981
Protokol (novel), 1982
Angels are Coming (novel), 1987
Ta'atuon (novel), 1989
Jeans, a Dog (children), 1991
Morning of Fools (novel), 1992
Bears and Woods (novel), 1995
Enemy Scope (novel), 1997
City of Refuge (novel), 2000
Nobody's Ever Died Walking (novel), 2007

Film and television
Again, Forever (feature film, wrote story and screenplay), 1985
Atalia (feature film, wrote story), 1986
The Class Queen (feature film, as actor) 1988
Winter Games (TV drama, wrote story) 1989
Nili (documentary feature film, wrote screenplay and directed), 1996
Enemy Scope, (TV mini-series, screenplay based on his novel), 1999
 "Nicole's Stations" (wrote screenplay. Based on his novel Rustic Sunset. Co-writer: Rony Gruber), 2001

Plays
David August (monodrama, based on his story), 1983
Ta'atuon (monodrama, based on his novel)
A Far Land (monodrama, based on his story), 1992
Morning of Fools (monodrama, based on his novel)
Uri Muri (drama), 1999

References
Yitzhak Ben-Ner at the Institute for the Translation of Hebrew Literature

External links

1937 births
Living people
Israeli journalists
Israeli male screenwriters
Israeli male dramatists and playwrights
Bernstein Prize recipients
Tel Aviv University alumni
Recipients of Prime Minister's Prize for Hebrew Literary Works